Hyde Park Spanishtown Creek, formally West Hyde Park, is a neighborhood within  the district of Hyde Park, which represents District 4 of the Tampa City Council. The 2000 census numbers were unavailable, however, the latest estimated population was 1,534 and the population density was 6,356 people per square mile.

Geography
Hyde Park Spanishtown Creek boundaries are roughly Courier City to the west, Hyde Park North to the north, Palma Ceia to the southwest and Morrison Grove to the east. The ZIP Code serving the neighborhood is 33606. The community is located at 27.934 degrees north, 82.474 degrees west. The elevation for the community is three feet above sea level.

Demographics
Source: West Hyde Park neighborhood detailed profile

The latest estimated population was 1,534, which consists of 781 males and 753 females. The median age is 34.7 for males and 35.7 for females. The percentage of marriage couple stands at 31.8%.

The median income for the neighborhood is $98,370. The average family size is 2.7 and the average household size is approximately 1.8 persons.

Education
Hyde Park Spanishtown Creek is served by Hillsborough County Public Schools, which serves the city of Tampa and Hillsborough County.

References

External links
West Hyde Park neighborhood detailed profile
West Hyde Park (in Hillsborough County, FL) Populated Place Profile

Neighborhoods in Tampa, Florida